Geetha is an Indian television drama in the Kannada language that premiered on the Colors Kannada channel on 6 January 2020. It stars Dhanush Gowda and Bhavya Gowda in the lead roles. The show is produced by Gagana Enterprises and is directed by K.S.Ramji.

Plot summary 
Geetha, a college-going, lower-middle-class girl wants to make it big in her life on her own, but she faces hurdles from Vijay, who hails from a rich family, studying in the same college. Vijay is a son of a minister who respects women, but his son Vijay is quite opposite to him. An arrogant Vijay studies in the college-owned by her father, and he gets caught red-handedly while copying in the college. Geetha decides to complain to college authorities, which earns her the wrath of Vijay, who leaves no stone unturned to spoil Geetha's life. He even abducts Geetha to tarnish her image. Geetha claims in front of the media that Vijay has married her and her life takes different changes after her marriage, forms the rest of the story.

Cast 
Main Cast

 Dhanush Gowda as Vijay; son of Minister Surya Prakash and Geetha's Husband
 Bhavya Gowda as Geetha; A flower selling girl and Vijay's wife

Recurring Cast

 Sharmitha Gowda as Bhanumathi; Minister Surya Prakash's Second wife and Vijay's Stepmother
 Vijay Shobraj as Sithara; Bhanumathi's brother
 Ashwath Neenasam as Sreenivas; Geetha's father
 Amrutha Roopesh as Susheela; Geetha's mother
 Nisarga as Sync Smitha; Geetha's college mate
 Jyesta as Kiran; Vijay's friend

Cameo Appearances

 Anupama Gowda as Bhumika
 Divya Wagulkar as Dasavala;Tribal girl

Adaptations

Production 
The show owing to the COVID-19 pandemic in May 2021 started shooting in Ramoji Film City, Hyderabad for around a month.

Awards

References 

2020 Indian television series debuts
Indian television soap operas
Kannada-language television shows
Serial drama television series
Colors Kannada original programming